Anthony R. Dickinson (born 1960) is a British academic, neuroscientist and a Scientific Advisor at the Beijing Genomics Institute. He specialises in brain development and incremental intelligence training.

Life
After some years working as a prototype electronics engineer, Dickinson graduated from the University of Sussex with a degree in Neuroethology, and continued his studies to obtain a pre-clinical Diploma in Neuroscience and surgery from the Royal School of Veterinary Medicine, at the University of Edinburgh.

After some time spent working as Research Associate to Dr. Alan Dixson on marmoset reproductive sex behaviour in the labs of the British Medical Research Council (1989–90) and later in the field studies of Mandrill baboons in the jungles of Gabon, West Africa (WHO attache, 1990–91), Dickinson then returned to the University of Edinburgh, where he was invited to conduct a longitudinal study concerned with the characterisation of intelligent systems (both real and artificial), involving experimental cognition work with human children, birds, monkeys, robots and human adult clinical outpatients.
 
Later a Chartered Psychologist (British Psychological Society), Dickinson accepted the position of Visiting Research Fellow to the Snyder Lab of the McDonnell Centre for Higher Brain Function at Washington University School of Medicine (WashU), in the USA (1999–2005). His principal researches there included investigations with electrophysiological correlates of hand–eye co-ordination behaviour in the posterior parietal cortex regions of the brain. Other research under Dickinson's supervision has involved the study of a wide variety of naturalistic behaviours of exotic animal species, both in captivity (largely involving the extensive collection of the Royal Zoological Society of Scotland) and wild populations of various primate species in Kenya, Gabon, Bolivia and Costa Rica. Other of his supervised student projects have recruited both human and non-human primates, dolphins and other cetaceans, ungulates, birds and insects covering a broad range of comparative topics including sexual behaviour, social dynamics and organisation, feeding and communication.

Awards
McDonnell-Pew CNS Investigator-Initiated Grant (PI, 2000–03),
Several ASAB Research Grant Award (PI 1997, 1998),
UFAW Research Grants (PI x4, 1997, 1998) and
R(D)SVS Visiting Research Fellowship (1990), and the distinguished MRC Advanced Studentship (1987–88).

Memberships
Dickinson's professional memberships include the Society for Psychological Science and the American Association for the Advancement of Science. He is an Associate Fellow of the British Psychological Society, the Hong Kong Psychological Society, the British Brain Research Association, the International Brain Research Organisation, The International Primatological Society, The New York Academy of Sciences, The Primate Society of Great Britain, the Royal Zoological Society of Scotland, the Society for Neuroscience, the Scottish Primate Group, and the Vision Sciences Society.

Works

References

External links

dickinson at LinkedIn

1960 births
Living people
People educated at St Mary's College, Southampton
Alumni of the University of Sussex
Alumni of the University of Edinburgh
Academics of the University of Edinburgh
British neuroscientists
Place of birth missing (living people)
Fellows of the Royal Society
Washington University in St. Louis fellows